Jan Boeksent or Joannes Boecksent OFM 1660-1727  was a Flemish sculptor, famous for his baroque wooden and marble carvings.

He was one of the students of Pieter Verbrugghen I. He was a Franciscan friar, first taking vows in August 1685. He is considered one of the most important sculptors of Flemish baroque carvings. Hendrik Pulinx is mentioned as one of his followers and students. He died in 1727 in the monastery of Ghent.

Works 
 St Peter's church, Gent.
 Tomb of Philippus Erardus van der Noot, Ghent Cathedral.
 Sint-Niklaas: St. Joseph Minor Seminary: pulpit, and other carvings.

References

Flemish Baroque sculptors
17th-century Flemish sculptors
Recollects
Belgian Franciscans